Chhimber چھمبر is a small village in tehsil Kharian Gujrat, Punjab, Pakistan. It is located near the cities of Dinga , Kharian, Mandi Bahauddin, and Jhelum.

The majority of the people in the village belong to the Junjua clan of the Jatt family. This village was originated by a person on his name Chhimber who was from Jat having sub-caste  Janjua by his caste. it remained inhabited for five generation and, due to  severe famine, this village was partially destroyed around 1836. it was rehabilitated in 1840 and has been continuously inhabited ever since. The vast majority of the people work in the agriculture industry. Chhimber is located on the bank of the Upper Jhelum Canal.

References

In 1836 many families were migrated to other Punjab Area and Kashmir. i.e. Jhang, Chiniot, and adopted various professions. Most of them writing their caste as "Chhaimber" which is clan of Janjua Jatt caste.

Populated places in Gujrat District